The 2021–22 Derde Divisie season was the sixth edition of the Dutch fourth tier, formerly called Topklasse, since the restructuring of the league system in the summer of 2016.

Saturday league

Teams

Number of teams by province

Standings

Fixtures/results

Sunday league

Teams

Number of teams by province

Standings

Fixtures/results

Promotion/relegation play-offs

Derde Divisie promotion/relegation playoffs 
Since Kozakken Boys and GVVV finished 16th and 17th respectively, they will have to play relegation playoffs against teams from the Derde Divisie for one spot in the 2022–23 Tweede Divisie.

Bracket

Quarterfinals

First legs

Second legs

Semifinals

First legs

Second legs

Final

First leg

Second leg

Hoofdklasse saturday promotion/relegation playoffs 
Since ODIN '59 and VVOG finished 16th and 17th respectively, they will have to play relegation playoffs against teams from the Hoofdklasse Saturday for two spots in the 2022–23 Derde Divisie.

Brackets

Semifinals

First legs

Second legs

Finals

First legs

Second legs

Hoofdklasse sunday promotion/relegation playoffs 
Since Hoogland and EVV finished 16th and 17th respectively, they will have to play relegation playoffs against teams from the Hoofdklasse Sunday for two spots in the 2022–23 Derde Divisie.

Brackets

Semifinals

First legs

Second legs

Finals

First legs

Second legs

References 

Derde Divisie seasons
Derde Divisie
Netherlands